Lake of the Lone Indian is a small lake in the eastern Sierra Nevada, near the John Muir Trail and Pacific Crest Trail in John Muir Wilderness. The outflow of Lake of the Lone Indian becomes Fish Creek, which eventually joins the Middle Fork of the San Joaquin River.

The lake was named in 1902 because the mountain above the lake appears to have a face of a Native American.

See also
List of lakes in California

References

Lone Indian, Lake of the
Lone Indian, Lake of the
Lone Indian
Lakes of Northern California